Walter Schlüter, (1911 – November 1977), was a West German racing and rally driver, who won the 1954 European Rally Championship.

Racing Driver

Walter was a fuel wholesale by trade, from Velbert. He became racing in the 1930, notably in a modified BMW 328. After the World War II, he played an instrumental in the re-establishing of the Automobilclub von Deutschland (AvD), and getting motor racing underway in Germany. In 1950, he entered the inaugural season of the Deutsche Meisterschaft Formel 3 where he raced a Monopoletta-BMW. During the season, he won F3 support race at the Großer Preis von Deutschland, on the Nürburgring Nordschleife. This result helped him to third overall in the championship.

In return the following season, but without much success, although he became to first German driver to complete in England following the war, when he drove his Monopoletta-BMW at Brands Hatch in the August Bank Holiday meeting.

Rally Driver

Walter, now aged forty switched to rallying for the 1952 season. He scored his first international victory in the sport when he was finished in second on the Rallye Travemünde, as co-driver to Helmut Polensky. The pairing continuing into 1953, where they took two victories as Polensky won the European Rally Championship.

Back on the track, Walter scored his greater result when he and Richard Trenkel took fourth place in the 1953 Internationales ADAC-1000 Kilometer Rennen Weltmeisterschaftslauf Nürburgring, a round of the World Sportscar Championship.

When in the Autumn of 1953, DKW created their new motor sport department, and Walter was one of the trio of drivers signed to tackle the European Rally Championship. By now, Walter had moved across to the driver’s seat. After victory on the Rallye Wiesbaden and two further podium finishers, he had been enough to secure the championship title for himself, ahead of the other two DKW drivers.

He continues with DKW for the next couple seasons, when 1955 he scored his first outright victory outside of Germany, when he wins Norway’s Viking Rally. This would turn out to be his last international victory as well.

Racing record

Career highlights

 = he was a co-driver on the event

Complete Rallye de Monte Carlo results

Complete RAC Rally results

References

World Sportscar Championship drivers
European Rally Championship drivers
1977 deaths
German racing drivers
German rally drivers
German Formula Three Championship drivers
1911 births